The Brock Badgers women's basketball team represents Brock University in the Ontario University Athletics conference of U Sports women's basketball. The Badgers have won two OUA championships, winning the Critelli Cup in 1983 and 2020.

History
Led by head coach Pat Woodburn, the 1982-83 Badgers team set a program record with 30 wins in one season, compared to merely three losses. Winning the OWIAA Championship, the Badgers emerged with the bronze medal at the CIAU (now U Sports) Championships. They would become the first Brock women's team inducted into the Badgers Athletics Hall of Fame.

In 2018, Mike Rao, a native of Welland, Ontario was appointed as head coach for the Badgers. During Rao's first season, the Badgers won 11 games, compared to 13 losses. Qualifying for the postseason, the Badgers enjoyed their first playoff victory since 2012. Reaching the second round, they were bested by the eventual national champion McMaster Marauders. His second season (2019–20) saw the Badgers enjoy a 17–5 record, along with their first appearance at the U Sports national championships since 2001–02.

Critelli Cup season
Heading into the 2019–20 season, the Badgers benefitted form a pair of transfers. Jenneke Pilling redshirted in 2018–19, transferring from the Windsor Lancers. Forward Samantha Keltos, raised in St. Catharines, arrived from an NCAA Division I school.

Samantha Keltos, who set a team record for blocks in a single game, registering nine against the York Lions on January 29, 2020, she would emerge as a postseason hero for the Badgers. Against the Western Mustangs, ranked fifth in the country, in the OUA Semi-Finals, Keltos registered 17 points for the sixth-ranked Badgers, along with seven rebounds, as the Badgers prevailed in a 69–65 final. For her efforts, Keltos was recognized as both, the OUA and U Sports Female Athlete of the Week.

Challenging the Ryerson Rams on February 29, 2020, in the Critelli Cup Final, Keltos logged 42 points, resulting in an emotional victory, as it marked the Badgers first provincial title since 1983. Shooting 10-for-15 in the opening half, she wound up as the Lululemon Player of the Game honours.

From three-point range, she went eight-of-nine, adding 12 rebounds, Keltos enjoyed her seventh career double-double, part of a statistical performance including three steals and a pair of assists. Winning the Critelli Cup, there was a sense of serendipity for the program. Of note, the Cup, awarded to the OUA Provincial Champion, is named in honour of former Brock basketball Coach and Assistant Athletic Director Chris Critelli.

The 2019–20 season marked a storybook ending for Melissa Tatti. Earning a trio of honors, highlighted by the 2019-20 OUA Player of the Year Award, OUA First-Team All-Star recognition, plus the pinnacle of a spot on the U SPORTS First Team All-Canadians, she would also establish herself among the program's statistical leaders. Finishing her Badgers career with 1,458 points in 100 games played, it ranks second in all-time regular-season scoring. She would also graduate as the program's all-time regular season leader in five statistical categories: field goals (507), assists (423), steals (303), free throws (243) and three-pointers (201).

At the 2020 U SPORTS Women's National Championships, Keltos was the Badgers scoring leader in each of their three contests. In addition, Samantha Keltos was named the Nike Top Performer (in recognition of each participating team's Player of the Game) in those three contests. Starting with 24 points in a 72–71 triumph versus the Calgary Dinos, she would follow it up with 23 points and 17 rebounds in a convincing 69–55 win versus the UPEI Panthers. In the gold medal game, marking the program's first appearance in the national championship game, she registered 21 points in an 82–64 loss  versus the Saskatchewan Huskies women's basketball program.

In the 2020 U Sports National Championship Game, Samantha Keltos had 21 points, two rebounds and one assist. For her efforts, she was recognized as the Player of the Game for Brock.

In the aftermath of the season, the Badgers were recognized as the 2019-20 OUA Female Team of the Year, an historic first in program history.

U Sports Elite 8 results

Individual leader scoring

Statistical leaders
During the 2019-20 OUA season, Melissa Tatti would lead the conference with 18.6 points per game. In the same season, Tatti set the Brock record for most points in a single season, amassing 407 in 21 games.

International
Candi Jirik : 1982 World Championships in Brazil, 1983 Pan American Games in Venezuela.

Awards and honours
Mike Rao: 2020 St. Catharines Sportsperson of the Year
Samantha Keltos and Melissa Tatti: 2020 St. Catharines Athletes of the Year
Diane Hilko: St Catharine's Sports Hall of Fame Inductee (Class of 2017)

Team Awards

Most Valuable Player
The team's Most Valuable Player is awarded the TJ Kearney Award.

1998-99: Shannon Hann
1999-00: Shannon Hann
2000-01: Shannon Hann
2019-20: Melissa Tatti

Rookie of the Year
2019-20: Kyanna Thompson

OUA Awards
2019-20 OUA Player of the Year: Melissa Tatti
2020 OUA Female Team of the Year

OUA All-Stars
First Team
2019-20 OUA First-Team All-Star: Melissa Tatti
2019-20 OUA Second Team All-Star: Samantha Keltos
2016-17 OUA First Team: Kira Cornelissen

Second Team
2018-19 OUA Second-Team All-Star: Melissa Tatti
2016-17 Second Team: Bridget Atkinson

OUA Women’s Basketball Showcase
2019 Showcase Participant: Melissa Tatti (named to Team Burns) 
2018 Showcase Participant: Kristin Gallant (named to Team Burns)

U Sports Awards
2019-20 Peter Ennis Award awarded to the Coach of the Year
 2019-20 U SPORTS First Team All-Canadian Melissa Tatti
U SPORTS Female Athlete of the Month (March 2020): Samantha Keltos
Samantha Keltos, U Sports Female Athlete of the Week (awarded Wednesday, March 4, 2020)

U Sports Nationals
 2020 U Sports National Championship Game - Nike Top Performers: Samantha Keltos, Brock
 2020 U Sports National Championship All-Star Team: Melissa Tatti, Brock
 2020 U Sports National Championship All-Star Team: Samantha Keltos, Brock

University Awards
 Mike Rao, 2020 Wally Barrow Memorial Coach of the Year Award.
 Brock Badgers Athletics 2019-20 Female Team of the Year

Athlete of the Week
Jessica Morris, Brock Badgers Female Athlete of the Week (awarded November 18, 2019)
Samantha Keltos, Brock Badgers Female Athlete of the Week (awarded February 17, 2020 and March 2, 2020)
Miranda Smith, Brock Badgers Athlete of the Week (December 3, 2018) 
Melissa Tatti, Brock Badgers Female Athlete of the Week (awarded November 4, 2019, January 13, 2020, January 27, 2020 and February 10, 2020)

Brock Badgers Hall of Fame
Class of 2005 Inductee: 1982-83 Brock Women's Basketball Team
Class of 2005 Inductee: Maureen Kelly
Class of 2003 Inductee: Michele Luke
Class of 2001 Inductee: Diane Hilko
Class of 1996 Inductee: Candi Jirik

References 

Brock University athletics
U Sports women's basketball teams
Women in Ontario